McCleskey is a surname. Notable people with the surname include:

Jeff McCleskey (1891–1971), American baseball player
J. J. McCleskey (born 1970), American football player

See also
McCleskey v. Kemp, a United States Supreme Court case